A Man and His Money is a 1919 American silent comedy film directed by Harry Beaumont and starring Tom Moore and Seena Owen. It was produced and distributed by Goldwyn Pictures.

Cast
Tom Moore as Harry Lathrop
Seena Owen as Betty Dalrymple
Sidney Ainsworth as Walter Randall
Kate Lester as Mrs. Johnston DeLong
Claire Du Brey as Varda Ropers
Sydney Deane as John Sturgeon
Eddie Sturgis as Chauffeur

Preservation status
A copy of A Man and His Money is held at the Museum of Modern Art (MOMA), New York.

References

External links

 A Man and His Money at IMDb.com

Lantern slide (Wayback Machine)

1919 films
American silent feature films
American black-and-white films
Goldwyn Pictures films
Films directed by Harry Beaumont
Silent American comedy films
1919 comedy films
1910s American films